The 1980 West Virginia Mountaineers football team represented West Virginia University in the 1980 NCAA Division I-A football season. It was the Mountaineers' 88th overall season and they competed as a Division I-A Independent. The team was led by head coach Don Nehlen, in his first year, and played their home games at their new stadium, Mountaineer Field in Morgantown, West Virginia. They finished the season with a record of six wins and six losses (6–6 overall).

Schedule

Roster

References

West Virginia
West Virginia Mountaineers football seasons
West Virginia Mountaineers football